Rasidi may refer to:

Addy Rasidi (born 1975), Singaporean guitarist
Sunarto Rasidi (born 1975), Indonesian weightlifter
Weny Rasidi (born 1983), French badminton player